Irumbazhikal is a 1979 Indian Malayalam Action. Drama film,  directed by A. B. Raj. The film stars Prem Nazir, Jayan, Jayabharathi and K. P. Ummer in the lead roles. The film has musical score by M. K. Arjunan.It was a box office hit.

Cast
Prem Nazir as Inspector Rajan
Jayan as Bullet Babu
Jayabharathi as Maya
K. P. Ummer as Katthi  Chandran
Cochin Haneefa as Krishnankutty
Paravoor Bharathan as Raghavan
Jose Prakash as Swami
P. R. Varalakshmi as Geetha
Kanakadurga as Sainaba
Anuradha as Thulasi
G. K. Pillai as Sankara Pilla
Manavalan Joseph
Murali Mohan (Malayalam Actor)
Vadivukkarasi as Thulasi
KPAC Sunny as School Master

Soundtrack
The music was composed by M. K. Arjunan and the lyrics were written by R. K. Damodaran.

References

External links
 

1979 films
1970s Malayalam-language films